Leptostomum inclinans known as the pincushion moss, is a species of moss found in southeastern Australia, New Zealand, and nearby islands. This species is commonly found as an epiphyte growing on tree trunks. However, it can also be found growing on soil or rocks.

This moss is characterized by closely-spaced stems and a dense covering of rhizoids. The leaves have an elongated, unbranched hairpoint, and the moss is recognizable by the numerous inclined capsules that protrude on long seta, giving it the appearance of a green pincushion.

References

Flora of New South Wales
Flora of Queensland
Flora of Tasmania
Flora of Victoria (Australia)
Flora of New Zealand
Flora of New Caledonia
Bryopsida